Lionel Cranfield  may refer to:
Lionel Cranfield, 1st Earl of Middlesex  (1575–1645), English merchant and nobleman
Lionel Cranfield, 3rd Earl of Middlesex (1625–1674), English nobleman
Lionel Cranfield (cricketer) (1883–1968), Gloucestershire and Somerset cricketer
Monty Cranfield, Lionel Montague Cranfield, (1909–1993), Gloucestershire cricketer and son of Lionel Cranfield (cricketer)